The 41st Macedonia Division (Macedonian: Четириесет и прва македонска дивизија) was formed on 25 August 1944 in the village of Šeškovo near Kavadarci. It was formed from the 2nd, 4th and 10th Macedonia Brigades which had a total strength of 2,700 soldiers. It mostly fought in Yugoslav Macedonia and Kosovo. During its existence the division had 3 different commanders and 4 different political commissars.

References 

Divisions of the Yugoslav Partisans
Military units and formations established in 1944